This is a list of hotels owned or managed by American hospitality company Marriott International.

Aruba 
 Aruba Marriott Resort & Stellaris Casino

Armenia 
 Armenia Marriott Hotel Yerevan

Canada

New Brunswick 
 The Algonquin Resort St. Andrews By-The-Sea

Quebec 
 Château Champlain

Denmark 
 Copenhagen Marriott Hotel

United Arab Emirates

Emirate of Dubai 
 Dubai Marriott Harbour Hotel & Suites

United Kingdom

England 
 Breadsall Priory
 Hanbury Manor
 Marriott London Park Lane

Wales 
 Cardiff Marriott Hotel

United States

Georgia  
 Atlanta Marriott Marquis

Indiana 
 Indianapolis Marriott Downtown

Iowa 
 Des Moines Marriott Hotel

New York 
 Algonquin Hotel
 HarborCenter
 LECOM Harborcenter

Oregon 
 The Bidwell Marriott Portland
 Portland Marriott Downtown Waterfront

Utah 
 Marriott Downtown at City Creek Hotel

Washington 
 Alaska Building

References 

Lists of hotels